Kapadne is a town in the state of Maharashtra, India. It is located in the Dhule taluka of Dhule district in Maharashtra.
It's one of major town of the district.

Website Link 
 http://www.kapadane.in

Location
Kapadne is located near the NH-3. It is 2 km far from NH-3.

Demographics
As of 2011 census, Kapadne had a population of 12877 with 6398males and 6479 females.

Transport

Rail
Kapadne has no railway station of its own, the closest railway station is Dhule which is 15 km from the village.

Road
Kapadne is connected by the Maharashtra State Road Transport Corporation (M.S.R.T.C). A number of private auto rickshaws and jeeps ply between kapadne to devbhane and towards dhule. They are mostly operated by self-employed youth of village. kapadne boasts to have about tractors and trucks. They are used to transport agricultural produce- Cotton, Onions, Ground nut, cereals etc. to markets at Dhule, Jalgaon, Indore, Surat etc. Tractors are used for agricultural works also.

Air
Kapadne has no airport of its own, the closest airport is at Dhule.

See also 
List of villages in Dhule District

References

Villages in Dhule district
Villages in Dhule taluka